
LLDB may refer to:
 Army of the Republic of Vietnam Special Forces, military units
 LLDB (debugger), a software debugger